Tridens is the scientific name for several genera of organisms and may refer to:

 Tridens (fish), a genus of catfish in the family Trichomycteridae, containing the single species Tridens melanops
 Tridens (fungus) , a genus of fungi in the order Rhytismatales
 Tridens (plant) , a genus of grasses in the family Poaceae

See also
 Asellia tridens, the trident bat